Tobaku Datenroku Kaiji: 24 Oku Dasshutsu-hen is the sixth and current part of the manga series Kaiji by Nobuyuki Fukumoto. It started in Kodansha's seinen manga magazine Weekly Young Magazine in 2017. Kodansha released its first two tankōbon volumes on June 6, 2018. As of November 4, 2022, 20 volumes have been released.


Volume list

Chapters not yet in tankōbon format
The following chapters were published in Weekly Young Magazine from July 2022 onwards, but have yet to be collected in tankōbon format.

References

Kaiji manga chapter lists